When Pride Still Mattered: A Life of Vince Lombardi is a biography published in 1999 and written by Pulitzer Prize-winner David Maraniss about former Green Bay Packers head coach Vince Lombardi. The book is an in-depth look at Lombardi's life, his coaching and leadership style, and his impact on the National Football League. After its release, it became a nationwide bestseller, with sales especially strong in the Wisconsin region. The book was adapted into a Broadway play titled Lombardi.

References

Citations

Bibliography

 

1999 non-fiction books
American football books
History of the Green Bay Packers
Simon & Schuster books
Sports biographies